Clarence Nicholas Coleridge (born November 27, 1930) was the first African American bishop of the Episcopal Diocese of Connecticut, from 1993 to 1999. Prior to that he was the Suffragan Bishop of Connecticut from 1981 to 1993.

Biography

Originally from Guyana, Coleridge obtained a Master of Social Work from the University of Connecticut and a Doctor of Ministry from the Andover Newton Theological School. He was ordained to the diaconate on January 27, 1961, and to the priesthood on January 1, 1962. He was consecrated on October 23, 1981. He has three honorary degrees, including one from Yale Divinity School. Habitat for Humanity built five houses in his name, the Coleridge Commons in Bridgeport, Connecticut. He also started the Bishops Fund for Children, a fund to enhance awareness of the plight of children at risk throughout Connecticut and to raise funds to underwrite social service programs that aid these children in urban, suburban and rural neighborhoods. The fund has so far given out $3.2 million.

Bishop Coleridge has been married for over 50 years to Euna J. Coleridge, a high school science teacher who was awarded the Olmstead Award for Teacher of the Year from Williams College. They have two children, Cheryl and Carolyn.

See also 
List of bishops of the Episcopal Church in the United States of America

References

1930 births
Living people
Place of birth missing (living people)
Episcopal Church in Connecticut
African-American Episcopalians
American Episcopalians
Yale Divinity School alumni
Episcopal bishops of Pennsylvania
Episcopal bishops of Connecticut